The 2019–20 UEFA Champions League knockout phase began on 18 February with the round of 16 and ended on 23 August 2020 with the final at the Estádio da Luz in Lisbon, Portugal, to decide the champions of the 2019–20 UEFA Champions League. A total of 16 teams competed in the knockout phase.

Times are CET/CEST, as listed by UEFA (local times, if different, are in parentheses).

Qualified teams
The knockout phase involves the 16 teams which qualified as winners and runners-up of each of the eight groups in the group stage.

Format
Each tie in the knockout phase, apart from the final, was to be played over two legs, with each team playing one leg at home. The team that scored more goals on aggregate over the two legs would advance to the next round. If the aggregate score was level, the away goals rule was applied, i.e. the team that scored more goals away from home over the two legs advanced. If away goals were also equal, then extra time was played. The away goals rule was again applied after extra time, i.e. if there were goals scored during extra time and the aggregate score was still level, the visiting team advanced by virtue of more away goals scored. If no goals were scored during extra time, the winners were decided by a penalty shoot-out. In the final, which was played as a single match, if the score was level at the end of normal time, extra time was played, followed by a penalty shoot-out if the score was still level.

The mechanism of the draws for each round was as follows:
In the draw for the round of 16, the eight group winners were seeded, and the eight group runners-up were unseeded. The seeded teams were drawn against the unseeded teams, with the seeded teams hosting the second leg. Teams from the same group or the same association could not be drawn against each other.
In the draws for the quarter-finals and semi-finals, there were no seedings, and teams from the same group or the same association could be drawn against each other. As the draws for the quarter-finals and semi-finals were held together before the quarter-finals were played, the identity of the quarter-final winners was not known at the time of the semi-final draw. A draw was also held to determine which semi-final winner was designated as the "home" team for the final (for administrative purposes as it was played at a neutral venue).

For the quarter-finals and semi-finals, teams from the same city were not to be scheduled to play at home on the same day or on consecutive days, due to logistics and crowd control. To avoid such scheduling conflict, if the two teams were to be drawn to play at home for the same leg, the order of legs of the tie involving the team with the lower domestic ranking in the qualifying season was to be reversed from the original draw.

On 17 June 2020, UEFA announced that due to the COVID-19 pandemic in Europe, the final stages of the competition would feature a format change: the quarter-finals, semi-finals and final would be played in a single-leg format from 12 to 23 August 2020 at the Estádio da Luz and Estádio José Alvalade in Lisbon, Portugal. The matches were played behind closed doors, through the decisions of the national and local government.

Following the competition restart in August 2020, a maximum of five substitutions were allowed, with a sixth allowed in extra time. However, each team was only given three opportunities to make substitutions, with a fourth opportunity in extra time, excluding substitutions made at half-time, before the start of extra time and at half-time in extra time. This followed a proposal from FIFA and approval by IFAB to lessen the impact of fixture congestion.

Schedule
The schedule was as follows (all draws were held at the UEFA headquarters in Nyon, Switzerland).

Following the first set of round of 16 second leg matches, the competition was postponed indefinitely due to the COVID-19 pandemic in Europe. The final, originally scheduled to take place on 30 May 2020, was officially postponed on 23 March 2020. A working group was set up by UEFA to decide the calendar of the remainder of the season.

Bracket

Round of 16

The draw for the round of 16 was held on 16 December 2019, 12:00 CET.

Summary

The first legs were played as scheduled on 18, 19, 25 and 26 February, as were the first set of second legs on 10 and 11 March 2020. Due to concerns over the COVID-19 pandemic in Europe, the second set of second leg matches were postponed by UEFA on 13 March 2020. On 17 June 2020, UEFA announced that the second legs would be played on 7–8 August 2020, with the venue to be decided between the home team's stadium and a neutral stadium in Portugal (at the Estádio do Dragão in Porto and the Estádio D. Afonso Henriques in Guimarães). On 9 July 2020, UEFA announced that the remaining second legs would be held at the venues originally proposed.

The first leg of the Atalanta v Valencia tie was retrospectively blamed by local civic and medical authorities for contributing to the extremely high concentration of coronavirus cases in Atalanta's home city of Bergamo. Several fans and players of Valencia also had positive diagnoses after returning from the game. The second leg of the Atlético Madrid v Liverpool tie was similarly blamed for the sharp increase in coronavirus-related deaths in North West England.

|}

Matches

Paris Saint-Germain won 3–2 on aggregate.

Manchester City won 4–2 on aggregate.

Atalanta won 8–4 on aggregate.

Atlético Madrid won 4–2 on aggregate.

Bayern Munich won 7–1 on aggregate.

2–2 on aggregate. Lyon won on away goals.

RB Leipzig won 4–0 on aggregate.

Barcelona won 4–2 on aggregate.

Quarter-finals

The draw for the quarter-finals took place on 10 July 2020.

Summary

The matches were played from 12 to 15 August 2020.

|}

Matches

Semi-finals

The draw for the semi-finals took place on 10 July 2020 (after the quarter-final draw).

For the first time since the 2006–07 season, no Spanish team managed to reach the semi-finals of the competition. It is also the first time that no English or Spanish team has managed to reach the semi-finals of the competition since the 1995–96 season, and the first time since the 1990–91 European Cup that no English, Italian or Spanish team reached the semi-finals. For the first time in competition history, two French teams managed to reach the semi-finals.

Summary

The matches were played on 18 and 19 August 2020.

|}

Matches

Final

The final was played at the Estádio da Luz in Lisbon. The "home" team (for administrative purposes) was determined by an additional draw held after the quarter-final and semi-final draws.

Notes

References

External links

Knockout Phase
2019-20
February 2020 sports events in Europe
March 2020 sports events in Europe
August 2020 sports events in Europe
Association football events postponed due to the COVID-19 pandemic